Acleris arcticana is a species of moth of the family Tortricidae. It is found in Norway, Sweden, Finland, Greenland and North America, where it has been recorded from Ontario, Illinois and Wisconsin.

The wingspan is 14–24 mm. The forewings are very dark smoky grey with a faint oblique antemedian band, represented by a few dark scales near the costa. There are some scattered blackish scales in the apical portion. The hindwings are pale smoky, slightly speckled with black near the apex. Adults are on wing from April to June and from August to September.

The larvae feed on Salix glauca.

References

Moths described in 1845
arcticana
Moths of Europe
Moths of North America